James Taylor may refer to:

Arts and entertainment
 James Taylor (born 1948), American singer/songwriter and guitarist.
 James Taylor (album), American folk singer's debut album
 James Taylor (author), American fiction writer
 James Taylor (British author and historian) (born 1963), British writer on maritime art
 James Taylor (tenor) (born 1966), American opera singer
 James Arnold Taylor (born 1969), American voice actor
 James J. Taylor (1931–2005), videographer
 James "J.T." Taylor (born 1953), lead singer with the band Kool & the Gang
 James Taylor Move, Australian psychedelic rock band
 James Taylor Quartet, led by the British acid jazz musician James Taylor
 James S. Taylor, of the UK house band Swayzak

Government and politics

Australia

 James Taylor (New South Wales politician)

 James Taylor (Queensland politician) (1820–1895), Queensland politician
 James Taylor (Victorian politician) (born 1934), Victorian politician

Canada
 James Taylor (1761–1834), farmer, merchant and political figure in New Brunswick
 James Taylor (d. 1856), businessman and political figure in New Brunswick
 James Taylor (Nova Scotia politician) (1771–1801), merchant and politician in Nova Scotia
 James A. Taylor (1928–2020), Ontario legislator who represented the Prince Edward—Lennox district
 James Davis Taylor (1863–1941), Canadian Member of Parliament
 James H. Taylor (born 1930), Canadian ambassador to Japan
 James Samuel Taylor (1872–1960), Canadian politician, printer and publisher

Ireland

 James Taylor (Irish politician) (1700–1747), Anglo-Irish politician

United Kingdom

 James Alastair Taylor (born 1951), Sheriff Principal of the Sheriffdom of Glasgow and Strathkelvin
 James Banks Taylor (died 1884), British businessman and member of the Legislative Council of Hong Kong

United States
 J. Alfred Taylor (1878–1956), U.S. Representative from West Virginia
 J. Will Taylor (James Willis Taylor, 1880–1939), US congressman from Tennessee
 James Taylor (New Mexico politician) (born 1966), New Mexico State Senator
 James Andrew Taylor (1835–1906), Wisconsin politician
 James C. Taylor (1930–1999), Illinois state legislator
 James Craig Taylor (1826–1887), Virginia lawyer, newspaper publisher and politician
 James Knox Taylor (1857–1929), Supervising Architect of the United States Department of the Treasury
 James Wickes Taylor (1819–1893), American diplomat

Military
 James Taylor (Alamo defender) (c. 1814–1836), soldier
 James Taylor Jr. (banker) (1769–1848), American Quartermaster General and banker, War of 1812, founder of Newport, Kentucky
 James Allen Taylor (born 1937), U.S. Army officer and Medal of Honor recipient
 James E. Taylor, U.S. Navy admiral

Religion
 James Taylor (minister) (1813–1892), Scottish Presbyterian minister and historical author
 James Taylor Jr. (Exclusive Brethren) (1899–1970), New York leader of Raven-Taylor Exclusive Brethren assemblies
 James Hudson Taylor (1832–1905), British Protestant Christian missionary to China, founder of the China Inland Mission (aka OMF Intl.)
 James Ignatius Taylor (1805–1875), Irish priest and educator

Sports

Cricket
 James Taylor (cricketer, born 1809) (1809–?), English professional cricketer
 James Taylor (cricketer, born 1846) (1846–1915), English cricketer
 James Taylor (cricketer, born 1974), English cricketer
 James Taylor (cricketer, born 1990), English Test cricketer
 James Taylor (cricketer, born 2001), English cricketer
 James Taylor (Scottish cricketer) (1929–2019), Scottish cricketer
 James Taylor (sportsman) (1917–1993), English-born Scottish cricketer, umpire

Other sports
 James Taylor (cyclist), British track cyclist
 James Taylor (sports administrator) (1871–1944), Australian sports administrator
 Jay Taylor (placekicker) (James Taylor, born 1976), American football kicker
 Candy Jim Taylor (James Allen Taylor, 1884–1948), player and manager in Negro baseball league 
 Zack Taylor (baseball) (James Wren Taylor, 1898–1974), player and manager in Major League baseball
 James Taylor, British race car driver, see 1998 International Formula 3000 season
 James Taylor (footballer), English footballer

Other
 James Taylor (lawyer), American lawyer who works for the Heartland Institute
 James Taylor (neurologist) (1859–1946), British neurologist
 James Taylor (tea planter) (1835–1892), in Sri Lanka
 James Braid Taylor (1891–1943), governor of the Reserve Bank of India
 James Haward Taylor (1909–1968), British geologist
 James Henry Taylor (1893–1972), American mathematics professor
 James M. Taylor (1930–1970), astronaut
 James Madison Taylor, known as Matt Taylor, early settler of southeastern Idaho
 James R. Taylor (born 1928), communications professor at University of Montreal

See also
 Jamie Taylor (born 1982), footballer
 Jim Taylor (disambiguation)
 James Taylor Jr. (disambiguation)
 James Bayard Taylor
 James Chapman-Taylor
 James Monroe Taylor